RenewableUK Cymru is the Wales branch of RenewableUK, and is the trade body for all renewable energy, and smart energy and storage technologies in Wales.

History 
RenewableUK Cymru's activities commenced in 2006 with the appointment of a full time Wales officer, Llywelyn Rhys. At that time RenewableUK was known as the British Wind Energy Association. In 2012, David Clubb took over as Director.

External links

References 

Business organisations based in the United Kingdom
Renewable energy in Wales